"Your Kiss Is Sweet" is a song and single written by Stevie Wonder and Syreeta Wright and performed by Wright under the name, "Syreeta". Released in 1975 it reached 12 on the UK charts in 1975, staying there for 8 weeks. It was her second, and biggest hit in the UK charts. It appears on Stevie Wonder Presents: Syreeta, Syreeta's second, full-length Motown album.

The song was covered in Icelandic, as "Búkolla", in 1977 by Bjork on her debut album Bjork.

References 

1974 songs
1974 singles
Tamla Records singles
American soul songs
Funk songs
Björk songs
Songs written by Stevie Wonder